Edwin "Ted" Evans (26 March 1849 – 2 July 1921) was an Australian cricketer who played in six Test matches between 1881 and 1886.

Born in Emu Plains, New South Wales and educated at Newington College (1865–1866), Evans was an off spinner with an ability to consistently land the ball wherever he wanted to and had some success in Australian first-class cricket.

In 1900, Tom Horan as "Felix" wrote in The Australasian: "Alfred Shaw used always refer to Ted Evans as the 'most genuine cricketer' he'd ever met...Lord Harris's comment in 1878 was that he had never played against a finer bowler than Evans. As a fieldsman he was magnificent, and in batting he proved a hard nut to crack, his defence being admirable." Evans was noted as having "a beautiful delivery, quick rise from the pitch, and in the words of Lord Harris 'an accuracy worthy of Alfred Shaw'"

However, when called up for the national team his accuracy deserted him, and he failed to make a serious impact.

After a career as a professional kangaroo shooter, Evans died in Walgett, New South Wales.

References

External links

"Mr. Edwin Evans" from the Australian Town and Country Journal, 10 February 1877

1849 births
1921 deaths
Australia Test cricketers
New South Wales cricketers
People educated at Newington College
Australian cricketers
Cricketers from Sydney